Hart Grove Creek is a stream in Jackson County in the U.S. state of Missouri.

Hart Grove Creek was named after the local Hart family which settled in a nearby grove.

See also
List of rivers of Missouri

References

Rivers of Jackson County, Missouri
Rivers of Missouri